Teracotona multistrigata is a moth in the family Erebidae. It was described by James John Joicey and George Talbot in 1924. It is found in the Democratic Republic of the Congo and Rwanda.

References

Moths described in 1924
Spilosomina